The tawny-crested tanager (Tachyphonus delatrii) is a species of bird in the family Thraupidae.
It is found in Colombia, Costa Rica, Ecuador, Honduras, Nicaragua, and Panama.
Its natural habitats are subtropical or tropical moist lowland forests, subtropical or tropical moist montane forests, and heavily degraded former forest.

References

tawny-crested tanager
Birds of Nicaragua
Birds of Costa Rica
Birds of Panama
Birds of the Tumbes-Chocó-Magdalena
tawny-crested tanager
Taxonomy articles created by Polbot
Taxobox binomials not recognized by IUCN